The rock horned lizard (Phrynosoma ditmarsi), also known commonly as  Ditmars' horned lizard and camaleón de roca in Mexican Spanish, is a species of lizard in the family Phrynosomatidae. The species is endemic to the Mexican state of Sonora, in northern Mexico, south of the Arizona border.  Bearing the shortest horns of all the horned lizards, it lives in thorn-scrub and deciduous Sinaloan woodlands. The rock horned lizard was "lost" to science for about 65 years. It has a unique habitat preference and limited distribution.  It also had a very imprecise holotype locality record which made it difficult to locate. An extraordinary effort by Vincent Roth based on a cross-correlational analysis of gut contents from only three specimens led to its rediscovery.

Etymology
Its specific name, ditmarsi, is in honor of Raymond Lee Ditmars, the first curator of reptiles of the Bronx Zoo, and a pioneer in herpetology.

Habitat
The preferred natural habitat  of P. ditmarsi is rocky areas in forest and shrubland.

Description
The rock horned lizard has its occipital and temporal horns reduced to flaring expansions. It has a deep and narrow occipital notch and a high postorbital ridge.  The mandibles of P. ditmarsi feature a large vertical expansion. It has a bare tympanum in the anterior neck fold posterior to a vertical row of four spines. It has a single row of lateral abdominal fringe scales, which are bluntly pyramidal.

Reproduction
P. ditmarsi is oviparous.

References

Further reading
Lowe CH, Robinson MD, Roth VD (1971). "A Population of Phrynosoma ditmarsi from Sonora, Mexico". Journal of the Arizona Academy of Science 6 (4): 275–277.
Roth VD (1997). "Ditmars' Horned Lizard (Phrynosoma ditmarsi) or the case of the lost lizard". Sonoran Herpetologist 10 (1): 2–6.
Stejneger L (1906). "A New Lizard of the Genus Phrynosoma, from Mexico". Proceedings of the United States National Museum 29: 565–567. (Phrynosoma ditmarsi, new species).
Turner, Dale S.; Van Devender, Thomas R.; Silva-Kurumiya, Hugo; Del Castillo, Norberto León; Hedgcock, Charles; Roll, Chris; Wilson, Michael; Ochoa-Gutierrez, Francisco Isaias (2017). "Distribution of Phrynosoma ditmarsi Stejneger, 1906, with notes on habitat and morphology". Mesoamerican Herpetology 4 (4): 979–985.

External links
Rock Horned Lizard Info

Phrynosoma
Reptiles of Mexico
Reptiles described in 1906
Taxa named by Leonhard Stejneger